Wellington is a village just west of West Palm Beach in Palm Beach County and  north of Miami.  As of 2019, the city had a population of 65,398 according to U.S. Census Bureau estimates, making it the most populous village in the state. It is the fifth largest municipality in Palm Beach County by population.  Wellington is part of the Miami metropolitan area.

History
Wellington named the property Flying Cow Ranch, due to his other occupation as an aviator and his initials spelling the word "cow". The ranch became protected against floodwaters from the Everglades after the United States Army Corps of Engineers constructed a levee to south of the property between 1952 and 1953. Following his death in 1959, his son Roger inherited the property. The family sold  at $300 per acre to Arthur William "Bink" Glisson, Charles' agent. Glisson sold the land for $1,000 per acre within the following several months. Many other farmers began purchasing or leasing portions of the Flying Cow Ranch in the 1960s. About  were used for growing strawberries at one point, which was claimed to be the largest strawberry patch in the world.

After Roger Wellington sold  of land to developer Jim Nall of Fort Lauderdale in 1972, the Palm Beach County Board of Commissioners unanimously approved a proposal by the Acme Drainage District for the area to become a planned unit development. Among the first projects included the development of 150 acre (0.61 km2) Lake Wellington and the construction of a golf course, a country club, and residential neighborhoods. Following acquisition of the project in the late 1970s by Gould Florida Inc., the company built the International Polo Club Palm Beach and the Aero Club, a neighborhood with a private airpark. The area's first official population count occurred during the 1980 Census, when Wellington was defined as a Census-designated place. A total of 4,622 people lived there at the time. Wellington functioned as a sprawling bedroom community with few shopping centers or restaurants until the 1990s.

A vote for incorporation of the village of Wellington was held on November 7, 1995, with 3,851 votes in support and 3,713 votes in opposition, a margin of just 138 votes. Wellington officially became a village on December 31, 1995, as a state revenue sharing program required it to exist in 1995 in order to be eligible for funding in 1996. The village became Palm Beach County's 38th municipality and the ninth most populous city in the county at the time, with approximately 28,000 residents. The first village council elections were held on March 12, 1996. None of the candidates for any of the five seats secured a majority of the votes, forcing runoffs to be held on March 26. The first elected village council members were Paul Adams, Michael McDonough, Tom Wenham, Carmine Priore, and Kathy Foster. Two days later, the council held its first meeting and selected Foster for mayor, Priore for vice mayor, and Colin Baenziger for village manager.

It has now become known as an international center for equestrian sports.

Geography

Climate

As typical in Palm Beach County and South Florida, Wellington has a tropical climate, with two main seasons: warm and dry and hot and wet.

Winters are mild to warm and humidity levels are relatively low. It is not unusual though for winter temperatures to reach .

Summertime is rainy season in South Florida and humidity levels increase dramatically. South Florida is vulnerable to hurricanes at this time of year.

Demographics

2020 census

As of the 2020 United States census, there were 61,637 people, 22,506 households, and 17,104 families residing in the village.

2010 census

As of 2010, there were 22,685 households, with 13.3% being vacant. In 2000, there were 12,938 households, out of which 69.7% were married couples, 47.2% had children under the age of 18 living with them, 9.7% had a female householder with no husband present, and 17.4% were non-families. 13.2% of all households were made up of individuals, and 4.0% had someone living alone who was 65 years of age or older.  The average household size was 2.95 and the average family size was 3.25.

2000 census
In 2000, the village the population was spread out, with 31.0% under the age of 18, 5.8% from 18 to 24, 29.7% from 25 to 44, 24.6% from 45 to 64, and 8.9% who were 65 years of age or older.  The median age was 37 years. For every 100 females, there were 95.5 males.  For every 100 females age 18 and over, there were 91.6 males.

As of 2015, the median income for a household in the village was $77,233. The per capita income for the village was $40,726.  About 2.9% of families and 4.3% of the population were below the poverty line, including 4.2% of those under age 18 and 3.8% of those age 65 or over.

As of 2000, 83.52% of residents spoke English as a first language, while 12.18% spoke Spanish, French accounted for 0.98%, French Creole for 0.79%, Italian made up 0.61%, and Vietnamese was the mother tongue of 0.47% of the population.

As of 2000, Wellington had the eighty-fifth highest percentage of Cuban residents in the US, with 3.27% of the village's population.

Arts and culture 

The Wellington Amphitheater hosts movie nights, musical and comedy performances, and the Food Truck Invasion.

The Mall at Wellington Green, and the Old Wellington Mall, are located in Wellington.

The Palm Beach County Library System operates the Wellington Branch. It hosts seasonal events such as the annual Top Gun model aircraft show, the Barett-Jackson Auto auction, art and antique shows and holiday parades.

Parks and recreation

Equestrian sporting events 

Wellington is known for its equestrian community and hosting equestrian events, notably show jumping, hunting, dressage and polo.

Wellington is host to the Winter Equestrian Festival, the largest and longest running horse show in the world from January to April. It holds more than forty weeks of equestrian competitions per year. A new expansion includes the Global Dressage Festival, begun in 2011. International competitors attend the equestrian events and social event held in the community.

Each year Wellington hosts several high-goal polo tournaments including the USPA Gold Cup and the U.S. Open Polo Championship at the Palm Beach International Polo Club. The International Polo Club was an idea created by players to build a facility to showcase the skills of the ponies and players. The arenas of play include three state-of-the-art playing fields and a stick and ball field. Brunches, charities, corporate events and more are hosted at the International Polo Club in Wellington.

Wellington is also home to The Palm Beach Masters series. A trio of unique events hosted at Deeridge Farms — a stunning location at the heart of equestrian sport in Wellington, Florida. These premium events offers riders, spectators, and sponsors unforgettable hospitality, unrivaled facilities, and world-class showgrounds.

Education

Primary and secondary schools 
The School District of Palm Beach County serves Wellington. Public schools in Wellington and schools serving Wellington include:

Public Elementary Schools
Wellington Elementary School
New Horizons Elementary School
Discovery Key Elementary School
Binks Forest Elementary School
Elbridge Gale Elementary School
Equestrian Trails Elementary School
Panther Run Elementary School

Public Middle Schools
Wellington Landings Middle
Emerald Cove Middle School
Polo Park Middle School

Public High Schools
Wellington High School
Palm Beach Central High School

Media
Wellington is serviced by a few different mainstream news publications.
 The Town-Crier Newspaper: First and longest operating local newspaper serving Wellington, Royal Palm Beach, Loxahatchee Groves, and surrounding areas.
 Live Wellington: Owned and operated by the Sun Sentinel. Live focuses on news in Wellington.

Infrastructure

Transportation
Wellington's public transportation consists of Palm Tran. It is also served by Palm Beach International Airport. Several highways pass through or near Wellington. U.S. Route 441 and State Road 7 jointly cross north-to-south in the eastern side of the village. Lake Worth Road, which is designated as State Road 802 to the east of Route 441/State Road 7, continues westward into Wellington. State Road 882 (locally known as Forest Hill Boulevard) also moves east-west partially through the village, before continuing westward and then northwestward to Southern Boulevard without the designation to the west of Route 441/State Road 7. Southern Boulevard (designated as both U.S. Route 98 and State Road 80), an east-to-west highway, lies just north of the village's northern boundary. Florida's Turnpike passes along the far eastern edge of Wellington, though the nearest entry and exit ramps are located at U.S. Route 98/State Road 80 and State Road 802, outside the municipal limits.

Public safety

The Village of Wellington receives both fire and police services on a contractual basis from Palm Beach County.

Fire and Emergency Medical Services
Palm Beach County Fire-Rescue provides fire protection and emergency medical services. There are 4 fire stations assigned to the village:
Station 20 – Engine 20, Rescue 20, Brush 20;
Station 25 – Engine 25, Rescue 25, Brush 625;
Station 27 – Engine 27, Rescue 27, Brush 27;
Station 30 – Engine 30, Rescue 30.

Law Enforcement
Police protection for Wellington is provided by District 8 of the Palm Beach County Sheriff's Office. District 8 operates from a sub-station located in the village, and is staffed by 68 sworn deputies and 6 civilian employees.

Notable people

See also
The Siren (sculpture)

References

External links
 

 
Villages in Palm Beach County, Florida
1995 establishments in Florida
Villages in Florida
Former census-designated places in Florida
Populated places established in 1972